Impossible (Music by the Book) is a compilation album by New Zealand-Australian singer Stan Walker, released on 25 September 2020 to coincide with the release of his first memoir, Impossible. The album compiles tracks from four of five of Walker's studio albums, one of two EPs and numerous non-album singles and guest appearances. The album peaked at number 9 in New Zealand.

An abridged version of the album was released on CD in Australia in December 2020.

Track listings

Digital

Compact disc

Charts

Weekly charts

Year-end charts

Certifications and sales

Release history

References

Stan Walker albums
2020 greatest hits albums
Sony Music compilation albums
Compilation albums by Australian artists
Compilation albums by New Zealand artists